The Prescott-Russell Recreational Trail is a  long rail trail in Prescott-Russell, Ontario, Canada, maintained by the county of Prescott-Russell.  The trail begins in the village of Saint-Eugène and goes to the eastern boundary of the City of Ottawa, passing through the townships of East Hawkesbury, 
Champlain, The Nation, Alfred and Plantagenet, and Clarence-Rockland.

The trail primarily passes through farmland, with some forested sections.  Because it runs along a railway right-of-way, it is quite flat.  The trail surface is mainly stone dust, although it is paved near population centres.  Notable sights along the trail include the former railway station in Bourget and the bridge over the South Nation River near Plantagenet.  Pavilions are located along the trail in Saint-Eugène, Vankleek Hill, Plantagenet, Bourget, and Hammond.

The trail is used for a variety of purposes, including hiking, cycling, and snowmobiling (in the winter).  Neither ATVs nor horse-riding are allowed on the trail, although horse-riding is allowed on the Prescott-Russell Trail Link.

The route runs along the former roadbed of the Canadian Pacific line between Ottawa and Montreal, which is now owned by Via Rail.  The rails were lifted in 1986, while the trail was inaugurated in 2006.  The agreement between Via and Prescott-Russell lasts until 2020.

Potential closure
In 2016, the Prescott-Russell announced that it was studying the idea of closing the trail, due to its $400,000 per year maintenance cost.

The county ultimately decided in the 2017 budget to cut the trail maintenance budget to $200,000 a year.  Further consultations on the viability of the trail have been held.

Prescott-Russell Trail link
The Prescott-Russell trail link is a  extension of the Prescott-Russell Recreational Trail into Ottawa, following the same former railway right-of-way.  It goes from the western end of the Prescott-Russell trail at the eastern border of the Ottawa, passing near Navan and Orleans before ending in a dead end near Highway 417.  It is maintained by the City of Ottawa.

References

External links
Prescott and Russell Recreational Trail

Rail trails in Ontario
2006 establishments in Ontario